Hernán Andrade Yañez (born November 1, 1960) is a retired racewalker from Mexico.

He competed, but was disqualified, in the 50 kilometres races at the 1987 World Race Walking Cup 1988 Olympic Games. He competed at the 1991 World Race Walking Cup, but did not finish.

He set his personal best (3:49:38) in the men's 50 km walk event in 1988.

Andrade is currently living in Quintana Roo, as a tourism promoter

Personal bests
50 km: 3:49:38 hrs – Mexico City, 3 April 1988

International competitions

References
 
 IAAF Fact & Figures

1960 births
Living people
Mexican male racewalkers
Olympic male racewalkers
Olympic athletes of Mexico
Athletes (track and field) at the 1988 Summer Olympics
Japan Championships in Athletics winners
20th-century Mexican people